St. Benedict Abbey is a Benedictine monastery in the village of Still River in Harvard, Massachusetts. It is known for being centered on praying the Divine Office and the Novus Ordo Missae in Latin.

History 
Its predecessor, the Saint Benedict Center began in 1941 as a student center in an old furniture store in Harvard Square on the corner of Bow and Arrow Streets, just a half a block from the Harvard Yard. It was directly across the street from the Romanesque front porch of St. Paul Church, Cambridge's renowned "university church".

The three original founders were Catherine Goddard Clarke, Avery Dulles (then a Harvard Law student), and Christopher Huntington, a Harvard dean. Catherine Clarke went on to help found the Slaves of the Immaculate Heart of Mary, Avery Dulles entered the Jesuit Order and later became a Cardinal, and Christopher Huntington became a priest on Long Island, New York.

Fr. Leonard Feeney later became the head of the Saint Benedict Center. The center was engaged in controversy with the Church over his interpretation of extra ecclesiam nulla salus (referred to as Feeneyism, meaning "outside the Church there is no salvation") which led to a lack of clarity regarding the center's status in the Catholic Church.  Under the direction of Feeney, Clarke and others organized into a religious community called the Slaves of the Immaculate Heart of Mary. In January 1958, the group moved from Cambridge to the town of Harvard. Differences in governance ultimately led to most of the Brothers becoming Benedictines and most of the Sisters reorganizing as the Sisters of Saint Benedict Center, Slaves of the Immaculate Heart of Mary.

Canonical recognition
The brothers' community gained canonical recognition as a Pious Union in 1975 and a Benedictine Priory dependent on the Swiss-American Congregation in 1980. The Priory became independent in 1990. In 1993, the Priory became a full-fledged abbey and the monks elected the Right Reverend Gabriel Gibbs, OSB, as first abbot.

The Saint Benedict Abbey follows the Benedictine Rule and is governed by the Benedictine Confederation.

Abbots of St. Benedict Abbey
 Right Reverend Gabriel Gibbs, OSB (1993–2010)
 Right Reverend Xavier Connelly, OSB (2010–2021) 
 Right Reverend Marc Crilly, OSB (2021–present)

See also
 Harvard, Massachusetts

References

External links
 

Benedict
Roman Catholic churches in Massachusetts
Catholic Church in Massachusetts
Buildings and structures in Harvard, Massachusetts
Communities using the Tridentine Mass